Jerome Robbins' Broadway is an anthology comprising musical numbers from shows that were either directed or choreographed by Jerome Robbins. The shows represented include, for example, The King and I, On the Town and West Side Story. Robbins won his fifth Tony Award for direction.

Production
The show opened on Broadway on February 26, 1989 at the Imperial Theatre and closed on September 1, 1990 after 633 performances and 55 previews.  Directed and choreographed by Jerome Robbins with Grover Dale as co-director, the cast featured Jason Alexander as the narrator, Charlotte d'Amboise, Faith Prince, Debbie Shapiro, Susann Fletcher and Scott Wise.

With an elaborate production and a cast of 62, the show reportedly cost US$8 million to produce, and was expected to recoup about 40 percent from the New York run, according to Bernard B. Jacobs (President of the Shubert Organization). "In a season that was so bereft of original musicals that Kenny Loggins on Broadway and Barry Manilow at the Gershwin were categorized as such, this reminder of Broadway's glory days was greeted with relief and rejoicing (and six Tony Awards). It featured extended sequences from West Side Story and Fiddler on the Roof."

Musical numbers
Sources: Internet Broadway Data Base; MasterWorks Broadway

Act I
 Gotta Dance (from Look Ma, I'm Dancin' )
 Papa, Won't You Dance With Me? (from High Button Shoes)
 Shall We Dance? (from The King and I)
 New York, New York (from On the Town)
 Sailors on the Town (from On the Town)
 Ya Got Me (from On the Town)
 Charleston (from Billion Dollar Baby)
 Comedy Tonight (from A Funny Thing Happened on the Way to the Forum)
 I Still Get Jealous (from High Button Shoes)
 Suite of Dances (from West Side Story)

Act II      
 The Small House of Uncle Thomas (from The King and I)
 You Gotta Have a Gimmick (from Gypsy)
 I'm Flying (from Peter Pan)
 On a Sunday by the Sea (from High Button Shoes)
 Mr. Monotony (from Miss Liberty)
 Tradition; The Dream; Sunrise, Sunset; Wedding Dance (from Fiddler on the Roof)
 Some Other Time (from On the Town)
 New York, New York (Reprise)
 Finale from On the Town

Awards and nominations

Original Broadway production
Sources: Playbill.com; InfoPlease

References

External links
 Internet Broadway Database listing
 ITDb entry

1989 musicals
Broadway musicals
Tony Award for Best Musical
Broadway
Tony Award-winning musicals